Wisconsin Rapids is a city in and the county seat of Wood County, Wisconsin, United States. The population was 18,877 at the 2020 census. The city also forms one of the core areas of the United States Census Bureau's Marshfield-Wisconsin Rapids Micropolitan Statistical Area, which includes all of Wood County and had a 2020 population of 74,207.

History
The American Indians called the area "Ahdawagam", meaning "Two-sided Rapids". Although Europeans began to settle this area in the 1830s, Wisconsin Rapids has been known by this name only since 1920. Prior to that, the community was divided by the Wisconsin River, with the west side incorporated as Centralia and the east side as Grand Rapids. The two cities merged in 1900, with the entire community taking the name Grand Rapids. The name was changed in 1920 to avoid mail and other goods from being misdirected to the other city already named Grand Rapids, Wisconsin in the same county, or to the much better known Grand Rapids, Michigan.

Geography

Wisconsin Rapids is located at  (44.386805, −89.823078).

Demographics

2020 census
As of the census of 2020, the population was 18,877. The racial makeup of the city was 87.4% White, 3.5% Asian, 1.4% Black or African American, 0.9% Native American, 1.5% from other races, and 5.3% from two or more races. Ethnically, the population was 4.6% Hispanic or Latino of any race.

2010 census
As of the 2010 census, there were 18,367 people, 8,296 households, and 4,626 families living in the city. The racial makeup of the city was 92.2% White, 0.7% African American, 1.0% Native American, 3.7% Asian, 0.9% from other races, and 1.5% from two or more races. Hispanic or Latino of any race were 2.9% of the population.

There were 8,296 households, of which 27.1% had children under the age of 18 living with them, 39.1% were married couples living together, 11.9% had a female householder with no husband present, 4.8% had a male householder with no wife present, and 44.2% were non-families. 38.7% of all households were made up of individuals, and 16.8% had someone living alone who was 65 years of age or older. The average household size was 2.17 and the average family size was 2.87.

The median age in the city was 41.1 years. 22.8% of residents were under the age of 18; 8.5% were between the ages of 18 and 24; 23.3% were from 25 to 44; 25.5% were from 45 to 64; and 19.8% were 65 years of age or older. The gender makeup of the city was 47.8% male and 52.2% female.

2000 census
As of the census of 2000, there were 18,435 people, 7,970 households, and 4,782 families living in the city. The population density was 1,390 people per square mile (536.8/km2). There were 8,426 housing units at an average density of 635.3 per square mile (245.3/km2). The racial makeup of the city was 94.04% White, 0.34% African American, 0.80% Native American, 3.46% Asian, 0.02% Pacific Islander, 0.37% from other races, and 0.97% from two or more races. Hispanic or Latino of any race were 1.31% of the population.

There were 7,970 households, out of which 28.0% had children under the age of 18 living with them, 46.0% were married couples living together, 10.6% had a female householder with no husband present, and 40.0% were non-families. 34.8% of all households were made up of individuals, and 16.0% had someone living alone who was 65 years of age or older. The average household size was 2.26 and the average family size was 2.93.

In the city, the population was spread out, with 24.7% under the age of 18, 8.5% from 18 to 24, 27.5% from 25 to 44, 19.8% from 45 to 64, and 19.4% who were 65 years of age or older. The median age was 38 years. For every 100 females, there were 90.1 males. For every 100 females age 18 and over, there were 86.2 males.

The median income for a household in the city was $34,956, and the median income for a family was $43,594. Males had a median income of $36,098 versus $22,466 for females. The per capita income for the city was $17,723. About 7.0% of families and 9.1% of the population were below the poverty line, including 12.5% of those under age 18 and 7.2% of those age 65 or over.

Economy
Known for its papermaking history, Wisconsin Rapids is also an important location for the cranberry industry. Wisconsin Rapids is the corporate home of the international educational software company, Renaissance Learning, as well as other national and global companies.

From its founding in 1894, Wisconsin Rapids was home to the corporate headquarters of Consolidated Papers, Inc, which was acquired by the Finnish company Stora Enso in early-2000. In 2007, NewPage acquired the paper production facility. In 2015, Verso Corporation acquired the mill. Verso continues its presence in the area with a paper mill that houses two paper machines and a kraft pulp mill. In June 2020, Verso announced the closing of their paper mill for at least two months, with the resulting loss of 900 jobs.

Transportation
The South Wood County Airport (IATA: ISW, ICAO: KISW, FAA LID: ISW), also known as Alexander Field, is a public use airport located one nautical mile (1.85 km) south of the central business district of Wisconsin Rapids.

Education

Wisconsin Rapids is served by Wisconsin Rapids Public Schools. Lincoln High School is the local public high school, serving grades 9 through 12. Assumption High School is a private Catholic high school. River Cities High School is an alternative to the local high schools. The city has two middle schools, Wisconsin Rapids Area Middle School (grades 6–8) and Central Oaks (Virtual) Academy (6–8). East Junior High was a junior high school for grades 8–9 before it closed after the 2017–2018 school year.

Good Shepherd Lutheran School (1–8th grade) and St. Paul's Lutheran School (3K–8th grade) are two grade schools of the Wisconsin Evangelical Lutheran Synod in Wisconsin Rapids.

Mid-State Technical College, which has a campus in the city, offers vocational diplomas, and Lakeland University offers qualifications in academic subjects.

McMillan Memorial Library serves Wisconsin Rapids and southern Wood County. McMillan was a Finalist for the 2019 National Medal for Museum and Library Service.

Media

Print media
 Daily Tribune, daily newspaper founded 1920 from merger of Grand Rapids Leader (est. 1914) and Grand Rapids Tribune
 Buyers' Guide, weekly ad sheet with some editorial content taken from Wisconsin Rapids City Times (See below)
 Wisconsin Rapids City-Times daily online newspaper launched in October 2013

Television

 WRCM: Wisconsin Rapids Community Media public, educational, and government access (PEG) broadcast on cable TV

Radio
Although this is a list of radio stations based in the Wisconsin Rapids area, the signals of radio stations from much of Central Wisconsin are commonly received in the city.

AM radio stations

 WFHR 1320 kHz, News/talk Radio – Established November 1940 – Originally broadcasting at 1340 kHz

FM radio stations

 Country Legends 24/7 105.5Mhz WIRI – 1980s, 1990s, and contemporary. Established as KZZA in 2003, later WRCW.
 Hot 96-7 96.7Mhz WHTQ Top 40 – Established as WYTE in 1985, later WLJY
 WIFC 95.5Mhz – CHR – Established 1969 – Formerly WSAU-FM
 WDEZ 101.9Mhz Country & western – Established as WRIG-FM in 1964
 Y106.5 106.5Mhz WYTE – Contemporary Country & Western – Established as WDLB-FM in 1965
 WGLX 103.3Mhz WGLX-FM – Classic Rock – Established as WFHR-FM in 1946, later WWRW.
 WSPT 97.9Mhz WSPT-FM – Greatest Hits – Established 1961.
 Wisconsin Public Radio 89.1 MHz WHAA – News, current affairs, and arts programming. Part of the Wisconsin Public Radio network, established locally 2007.

Recreation and culture

Wisconsin Rapids has several local parks, including Robinson Park, Gaynor Park, and Lyon Park. There is also a skate park. The state water-skiing championships are held at Lake Wazeecha every year and the national BMX Bandit cycling championships are held at the Central Wisconsin BMX velodrome.

The Wisconsin Rapids Aquatic Center opened in July 2020 and features several pools and other recreational facilities including a tennis court, pickleball courts, an adventure playground, ice-skating rink, and splash pad.

There are three museums, the South Wood County Historical Corporation Museum, the Alexander House, and the Wisconsin River Paper Making Museum, all of which are housed in historical family homes.

The Wisconsin Rapids Riverkings are a hockey team who is a member of the United States Premier Hockey League and won the Midwest Elite Championship in the 2016–2017 season. The Riverkings currently play their home games at the South Wood County Recreation Center.

The Wisconsin Rapids Rafters are a collegiate summer baseball team formed in 2010 who are a member of the Northwoods League. The Rafters won the league championship in 2016. They currently play their home games at Witter Field.

The state cross country running championships are held in Wisconsin Rapids annually, as are the state (and sometimes national) water skiing tournaments.

The Alexander House is a museum to the history of the Nekoosa Edwards Paper Company (NEPCO), and also hosts art exhibitions. The building is the former home of the Alexander Family, which ran the Nekoosa Edwards Paper Company.

The South Wood County Historical Corporation Museum houses multiple exhibits covering the history of the South Wood County area. The building is the former Witter family home, Shadowlawn.

There is a municipal zoo which is free to enter, and operated during the summer only.

There is a prairie chicken sanctuary at the Buena Vista Wildlife Reservation, and every year the Prairie Chicken Festival is held.

The Souper Snow Sculpture Spectacular that takes place every February is one of the largest snow sculpture competitions in the country by numbers of sculptures.

The FRM Music Festival happens every June, as does the Cranberry Blossom Festival. The Grand Affair Arts Festival takes place in September of each year (2020 excepted, due to COVID-19 precautions).

Notable people

 Ken Anderson, professional wrestler
 Mark E. Anderson, U.S. National Guard general
 Bonnie Bartlett, actress
 Vince Biegel, NFL linebacker for the Baltimore Ravens
 Bruno Block, MLB catcher
 Theodore W. Brazeau, Wisconsin legislator
 Arthur J. Crowns, Wisconsin legislator
 James Daly, actor
 Paul Dauenhauer, Engineer & inventor
 George R. Gardner, Wisconsin legislator
 Orestes Garrison, Wisconsin legislator
 John A. Gaynor, Wisconsin legislator
 Harvey F. Gee, Wisconsin legislator
 Bill Granger, journalist and novelist
 George Hambrecht, Wisconsin legislator
 Jidenna, hip-hop musician
 Stephen E. Johnson, U.S. Navy admiral
 William Merriam, Wisconsin legislator
 Tom Metcalf, MLB pitcher
 Edith Nash, educator and poet
 Philleo Nash, professor and anthropologist
 Grim Natwick, animator and film director
 George Allen Neeves, Wisconsin legislator
 Casey Nelson, NHL player
 John Offerdahl, NFL player
 Peter Pernin, Catholic pastor and Peshtigo fire memoirist
 John M. Potter, Wisconsin legislator
 Bryan Reffner, NASCAR driver
 Don Rehfeldt, All-American college and NBA basketball player
 Donald E. Reiland, Wisconsin legislator
 Scott Scharff, NFL player
 Thomas B. Scott, Wisconsin legislator
 Arthur H. Treutel, Wisconsin legislator
 Dick Trickle, NASCAR driver
 Robert Uehling, Wisconsin legislator
 Byrde M. Vaughan, Wisconsin legislator
 Charles M. Webb, Wisconsin legislator
 William E. Wheelan, Wisconsin legislator
 Herman C. Wipperman, Wisconsin legislator
 Isaac P. Witter, Wisconsin legislator
 Joseph Wood, merchant, and Wisconsin legislator

References

External links
 City of Wisconsin Rapids, Wisconsin
 Wisconsin Rapids Chamber of Commerce
 Wisconsin Rapids Area Convention and Visitors Bureau
 Wisconsin Rapids City Times
 Wisconsin Rapids Public Schools

 
1920 establishments in Wisconsin
Cities in Wisconsin
Cities in Wood County, Wisconsin
Wisconsin Rapids-Marshfield
County seats in Wisconsin